Hurby massacre was a mass murder of the Polish population of the Hurby village, perpetrated on June 2, 1943, by a death squad of the Ukrainian Insurgent Army (UPA) and so-called brushwood self defence commando (СКВ) made up of Ukrainian peasants, during the province-wide Massacres of Poles in Volhynia and Eastern Galicia in World War II. Hurby belonged to the Second Polish Republic before the war began. It used to be located in the powiat Zdobłunowski of the Wołyń Voivodeship. It is now a valley (урочище, or uroczysko) by the same name in western Ukraine. About 250 Poles were murdered in the attack, which was confirmed by the UPA commander for Volyn, Dmytro Klyachkivsky, who said in his communique of June 1943 that Hurby .

Eyewitness testimony

Below is the eyewitness account of the massacre from the already translated testimony of Irena Gajowczyk, which was published by the Ministry of Foreign Affairs as part of online "Witnesses of the massacre speak out" initiative in 2016.

See also
Massacres of Poles in Volhynia and Eastern Galicia

References

1943 crimes in Poland
June 1943 events
Massacres in Poland
Massacres of Poles in Volhynia
Massacres in 1943
War crimes committed by the Ukrainian Insurgent Army
Massacres in Ukraine